Madagascar competed at the 2019 African Games held from 19 to 31 August 2019 in Rabat, Morocco. Athletes representing Madagascar won six gold medals, four silver medals and two bronze medals. The men's team won the gold medal in 3x3 basketball and all other medals were won in weightlifting.

Medal summary

Medal table 

|  style="text-align:left; width:78%; vertical-align:top;"|

|  style="text-align:left; width:22%; vertical-align:top;"|

3x3 basketball 

Solondrainy Alpha Jean Arnol, Randriamampionona Elly, Rakotonirina Fiary Jonhson and Ratianarivo Livio Rocheteau represented Madagascar in 3x3 basketball. They won the gold medal in the men's tournament.

Archery 

Gabriel Thiery Randrianasoloniaiko competed in archery in the men's individual recurve event.

Athletics 

Madagascar competed in several events in athletics.

Claudine Njarasoa competed in the women's 100 metres event. She advanced to the semifinals and did not advance to compete in the final.

Vanessa Embony competed in the women's 200 metres event. She did not advance to compete in the semifinals.

Boxing 

Andrianarivelo Marco Jerome (men's 57kg) and Heriniaina Nomenjanahary Tony (men's 52kg) competed in boxing.

Marco Jerome lost his only match against Everisto Mulenga.

Nomenjanahary Tony advanced to the quarterfinals where he was eliminated by Rajab Otukile Mahommed.

Fencing 

Jolan Andriamamonjy, Tonny Andriamamonjy, Jennifer Capriati Rahariniaina and Marie Solange Razafindrazaka represented Madagascar in fencing.

Judo 

Eight athletes represented Madagascar in judo: Herikanto Kevin Royce Andriamanoelina, Andriambololona Hajanirina Zo, Rambeloson Lita, Fetra Ranaivoarisoa, Aina Laura Rasoanaivo Razafy, Setra Razafialison, Bernardin Karamaly Sergio and Ratsiavy Norah Tieffenbach.

Karate 

Madagascar competed in karate.

Table tennis 

Madagascar competed in table tennis.

Taekwondo 

Madagascar competed in taekwondo.

Tennis 

Madagascar competed in tennis.

Weightlifting 

Madagascar competed in weightlifting. In total weightlifters representing Madagascar won five gold medals, four silver medals and two bronze medals and the country finished 3rd in the weightlifting medal table.

Jean Ramiarimanana won the gold medals in the Men's 55 kg Snatch and Men's 55 kg events and the silver medal in the Men's 55 kg Clean & Jerk event.

Eric Andriantsitohaina won the silver medals in the Men's 61 kg Clean & Jerk and Men's 61 kg events and the bronze medal in the Men's 61 kg Snatch event.

Jules Andriamahefa won the bronze medal in the Men's 61 kg event.

Tojonirina Andriantsitohaina won the silver medal in the Men's 67 kg Snatch event.

Rosina Randafiarison won the gold medals in all three Women's 45 kg events.

Wrestling 

Two athletes represented Madagascar in wrestling: Bienvenu Andriamalala competed in the men's freestyle 57 kg event and Marie Julienne Rasendrasoa competed in the women's freestyle 57 kg event.

References 

Nations at the 2019 African Games
2019
African Games